Larry and the Meaning of Life is the third installment in author Janet Tashjian's novel series about anti-consumerist Internet celebrity Josh "Larry" Swensen. It is the sequel to The Gospel According to Larry and Vote for Larry. It was released on September 16, 2008.

The novel centers on a revelation Josh experiences at Walden Pond. Tashjian has stated that this book will be more comedic in nature than the previous installments, calling it "a laugh-out-loud page-turner".

References 

2008 American novels
Novels by Janet Tashjian
American comedy novels
American young adult novels
Books about meaning of life